Bonner is both a surname and a given name. Notable people with the name include:

Surname:
 Anthony Bonner (born 1968), American basketball player
 Bill Bonner (author) (born 1948), American finance writer
 Bill Bonner (politician), Canadian politician for the Alberta Liberal Party
 Bryan & Baxter Bryan Bonner – paranormal investigator, skeptic
 Charles George Bonner (1884–1951), English recipient of the Victoria Cross
 Corella and Bertram F. Bonner, philanthropes and founders of the Bonner Foundation
 Cornelius Bonner (born 1976), American football player
 Edmund Bonner (died 1569), English bishop
 Enda Bonner (born 1949), Irish politician
 Frank Bonner (1942–2021), American actor, best known from WKRP in Cincinnati
 Frank Bonner (baseball) (1869–1905), American baseball player
 Gemma Bonner (born 1991), English association football player
 George Washington Bonner, known as Kid Canfield (1878–1935), American gambler and con man
 George Wilmot Bonner (1796–1836), British wood engraver
 Gerald Bonner (chess player) (born 1941), Scottish chess master
 Henry Derek Elis (born Henry Derek Bonner), American singer.
 Herbert Covington Bonner (1891–1965), American politician and U.S. Representative 1940–1965
 Hilary Bonner (born 1950), British writer
 Isabel Bonner (1907–1955), American stage actress
 Jennifer Bonner (born 1979), American architect
 Jill Bonner (born 1937), British-American physicist
 Jo Bonner (born 1959), American politician
 Joe Bonner (1948–2014), American jazz pianist
 John Tyler Bonner (1920–2019), American biologist
 Judy L. Bonner, American academic
 Juke Boy Bonner (1932–1978), American blues musician
 Kevin Bonner, Irish Gaelic footballer
 Leroy "Sugarfoot" Bonner (1943–2013), American musician
 Mark Bonner (disambiguation), two soccer footballers
 Mark Bonner (footballer) (born 1974), English footballer
 Mark Bonner (football manager) (born 1985), English football head coach 
 Matt Bonner (born 1980), American professional basketball player
 Michelle Bonner (born 1972), sports anchor
 Neville Bonner (1922–1999), Australian politician                       
 Nigel Bonner (19281994), British zoologist and Antarctic marine mammal specialist
 Nina Bonner (born 1972), Australian field hockey goalkeeper
 Nkrumah Bonner (born 1989), Jamaican cricketer
 Packie Bonner (born 1960), Irish footballer                                            
 Richell Bonner (born 1971), reggae artist known as Richie Spice                      
 Sherdrick Bonner (born 1968), American professional quarterback
 Teneisha Bonner (1981–2019), Jamaican-born English dancer
 Tom Bonner (born 1988), a Scottish footballer
 Tom W. Bonner (1910–1961), American experimental physicist
 Tony Bonner Australian actor, the helicopter pilot in Skippy 
 William Bonner (disambiguation), several people
 William Bonner (newscaster) (born 1963), Brazilian newscaster, publicist and journalist
 William Nigel Bonner (1928–1994), British zoologist
 William Ray Bonner (born 1948), perpetrator of a shooting spree in Los Angeles, California, 1973
 Yelena Bonner (1923–2011), Russian dissident, widow of Andrei Sakharov
 Zach Bonner (born 1997), founder of Little Red Wagon Foundation, Inc.

Given name:
 Bonner Fellers (1896–1973), US Colonel
 Bonner Mosquera (born 1970), Colombian former footballer
 Bonner Pink (1912–1984), British politician
 Bonner L. Stiller (born 1956), US politician

See also
Bonner (disambiguation)

German-language surnames